Michaela McManus (born May 20, 1983) is an American actress, known for her portrayals of Lindsey Strauss on One Tree Hill, A.D.A. Kim Greylek on Law & Order: Special Victims Unit, and Grace Karn on the NBC drama Aquarius.

Early life
McManus, a Warwick, Rhode Island, native, daughter of James "Jim" and Patricia McManus of Warwick, Kent County, Rhode Island, graduated from Fordham University, attended NYU's graduate acting program before leaving to pursue her career in Los Angeles.

Career
In 2008, she joined the cast of season five of One Tree Hill playing Lindsey Strauss, the love interest of Lucas Scott (Chad Michael Murray). After completing her work on One Tree Hill, she booked a guest role on season five of CSI: NY. She was subsequently announced as joining the cast of season ten of Law & Order: Special Victims Unit as Assistant District Attorney Kim Greylek. She was abruptly written out of SVU in the middle of season ten in which ADA Alexandra Cabot (Stephanie March) returned. However, McManus continued to be credited in season ten's main titles, and it was later confirmed that McManus would not be returning to SVU. 

Since then, she has had guest roles in prime time shows such as Castle, CSI: Miami, The Vampire Diaries, and Hawaii Five-0. She also appeared in the music video 'Glad You Came' by The Wanted. She starred as Tara on the NBC series Awake in 2012, and as Grace Karn on Aquarius in 2015. In 2017, McManus had supporting roles in SEAL Team as Alana Hayes, and The Orville as the Krill Teleya. She appeared in the short lived NBC series The Village as Sarah Campbell in 2019.

In November 2020, McManus was cast in a recurring role on the third season of the Netflix psychological thriller series You.

Personal life
McManus married writer/producer Mike Daniels on June 3, 2011. In January 2014, McManus announced that she was expecting their first child. The couple had son Gabriel October Daniels on April 3, 2014. Their second child, Declan Griffith Daniels, was born on September 13, 2016. Their third child, daughter Indigo Irene Daniels, was born May 12, 2021.

She is of Scottish heritage.

Filmography

Film

Television

References

External links
 

1983 births
21st-century American actresses
Actresses from Rhode Island
American film actresses
American television actresses
Fordham University alumni
Living people
New York University alumni
People from Warwick, Rhode Island